Waldemar II, Prince of Anhalt-Zerbst (died bef. 24 August 1371) was a German prince of the House of Ascania and ruler of the Principality of Anhalt-Zerbst.

He was the eldest child and only son of Waldemar I, Prince of Anhalt-Zerbst by his first wife Elisabeth, daughter of Rudolf I, Elector of Saxony and Duke of Saxe-Wittemberg.

Life
After the death of his father in 1368, Waldemar became the new co-ruler of the principality of Anhalt-Zerbst with his cousin John II. His reign only lasted four years. After his death unmarried and childless, he was succeeded by John II, who became  the sole ruler over Anhalt-Zerbst.

Princes of Anhalt-Zerbst
1371 deaths
Year of birth unknown